District 5 is one of 22 central districts of Tehran County in Tehran Province, Iran. This district is limited to Kan River and lands of District 22 in the west and to Mohammad Ali Jenah and Ashrafi Esfahani highways in the east. At the 2010 census, its population was 793,750, in 255,333 families.

Geography 
District 5 of Tehran Municipality is located in northwest of the capital. The northern part of this municipal district is located on the height of the western slopes of Alborz Mountains and its southern part is in the neighborhood of Karaj Special Road.

Neighborhoods 
The most famous neighborhoods of District 5 are Almahdi (the upper-class region in the District), Farahzad, Kan and Sooleqan, Bagh-e Feyz, Poonak, Shahran, Ferdows, Ariya-Shahr and  ekbatan.

Areal details 
The District 5 divided in seven regions and seventeen neighborhoods.

References 

Tehran County
Iran geography-related lists